Mac meic Aedh Ua Flaithbheartaigh (died 1091) was King of Iar Connacht.

Biography

The chief who died in 1091 is given as mac meic Aed Ua Flaithbheartaigh/son of the son of Aedh Ua Flaithbheartaigh, hence his forename is unknown. No further details are known.

See also

 Ó Flaithbertaigh

References

 West or H-Iar Connaught Ruaidhrí Ó Flaithbheartaigh, 1684 (published 1846, ed. James Hardiman).
 Origin of the Surname O'Flaherty, Anthony Matthews, Dublin, 1968, p. 40.
 Irish Kings and High-Kings, Francis John Byrne (2001), Dublin: Four Courts Press, 
 Annals of Ulster at CELT: Corpus of Electronic Texts at University College Cork
 Byrne, Francis John (2001), Irish Kings and High-Kings, Dublin: Four Courts Press, 

People from County Galway
1091 deaths
Mac
11th-century Irish monarchs
Year of birth unknown